The 1906 United States House of Representatives elections in Florida for three seats in the 60th Congress were held on November 6, 1906.

Background
Florida was represented by three Democrats in 1906, continuing their long-term domination of politics in Florida (and other Southern States).  In the previous election, the Democratic candidate had faced a Republican and a Socialist opponent.  In 1906, in contrast, the Socialists ran candidates in the 1st and 3rd district, while the Republicans ran a candidate in the 2nd district, so that each district had only two candidates running.  All three incumbents ran successfully for re-election.

Election results

See also
United States House of Representatives elections, 1906

References

1906
Florida
United States House of Representatives